Max Wykes-Joyce (1924 in Worcestershire – 2002) was a British art and literary critic.

Biography 
In the Second World War, Wykes-Joyce served in the Royal Air Force. He was a member of the International Association of Art Critics and worked as an art critic for the International Herald Tribune from 1967 to 1987 and contributed to ArtReview, then titled Arts Review in the 1960s. He was also inducted into the Accademia Italia delle Arti and was awarded its Gold medal.

Wykes-Joyce has written several books on the arts.

Selected works 
 Triad of genius. Part I, Edith and Osbert Sitwell. Peter Owen LTD, 1953. ASIN: B003AJBNN6
 7000 years of pottery and porcelain. Philosophical Library, 1958. ASIN: B0007DXL42
 Cosmetics and adornment: Ancient and contemporary usage. Owen, 1961. ASIN: B0000CL63U
 Art in Israel. With an introduction from Benjamin Tammuz. WH Allen, 1966. ASIN: B000JQQIPQ
 Knut Steen Floating Gravity Recent Sculptures and Graphics. Leinster Fine Art & Leicestershire Museums, 1985. ASIN: B002IFRY0Y
 Basil Alkazzi - new seasons: Recent works 1989 - 1993. Izumi, 1993. 
 British Art Now - A Personal View. Together with Edward Lucie-Smith and Zsuzsi Roboz, Art Books International, 1993. 
 Charlotte Kell, 1944-2006: Collages, Art Boxes and Sculpture. Mailer Press, 2007.  (originally published in 2002)

References

External links 
Basil Alkazzi (*1938) Artist web site
Harry Barr (1896-1987) Artist web site
Max Wykes-Joyce papers relating to Ezra Pound, 1949-1991

1924 births
British literary critics
2002 deaths